Marius Zwiller (25 September 1905 – 12 December 2000) was a French swimmer. He competed in the men's 200 metre breaststroke event at the 1924 Summer Olympics.

References

External links
 

1905 births
2000 deaths
Olympic swimmers of France
Swimmers at the 1924 Summer Olympics
French male breaststroke swimmers